Lech Gajdziński (born 25 September 1946) is a Polish athlete. He competed in the men's discus throw at the 1968 Summer Olympics.

References

1946 births
Living people
Athletes (track and field) at the 1968 Summer Olympics
Polish male discus throwers
Olympic athletes of Poland
Place of birth missing (living people)
Universiade silver medalists for Poland
Universiade medalists in athletics (track and field)